Eric Norman McKenzie (9 December 1910 – 28 April 1994) was an Australian cricketer. McKenzie represented Western Australia in one first-class match as a right-handed batsman, against the South African tourists at Perth in October 1931. He also played in grade cricket, and played field hockey for Western Australia. McKenzie enlisted in the Australian Army during the Second World War, and was posted to England, where he played in several games for an army cricket team. His brother Douglas McKenzie and son Graham McKenzie also represented Western Australia.

References

1910 births
1994 deaths
Australian cricketers
Australian military personnel of World War II
Cricketers from Western Australia
Field hockey people from Western Australia
People from Kalgoorlie
Western Australia cricketers
Australian male field hockey players
Military personnel from Western Australia